The Libyan Government Library in Tripoli had 37,000 volumes in 2002.

References

See also 
 National Archives of Libya

Libraries in Libya
Organizations based in Tripoli, Libya